The 1978 Hammersmith Council election took place on 4 May 1978 to elect members of Hammersmith London Borough Council in London, England. The whole council was up for election, with an extra two wards and 10 fewer councillors - and the council went in no overall control.

Background
The number of council seats was reduced from 60 to 50 - with the new council comprising 19 two seat wards, and 4 three seat wards.

Both Labour and the Conservatives fielded a full slate of 50 candidates.

The Liberal Party ran 20 candidates across 15 wards - an increase from the 19 candidates they fielded in 1974.

The National Front fielded 14 candidates across 7 wards - gaining an average of 81 votes each.
Across London the National Front ran 602 candidates - pulling in an average of 151 votes each.

The 'Save London Alliance' ran 18 candidates across 12 wards in a variety of alliances with 'West Kensington Environment' (9 candidates), 'Ratepayers Association' (2 candidates), 'Glenthorne Road Campaign' (1 candidate) and without additional alliance (6 candidates).  Across London 80 other candidates stood under the 'Save London Alliance' banner.

In the White City & Shepherd's Bush ward three candidates stood for 'Socialist Unity' - a further 9 candidates across London stood for the same party.

In the same ward a single candidate stood for the Workers Revolutionary Party - the party fielded a further 15 candidates across London.

In an era when candidates could choose their party designation without reference to an officially registered entity - one person in the Broadway ward ran under the 'Retired Garage Proprietor' banner.  He finished just ahead of the National Front and Save London Alliance candidates.

One candidate in the Coleshill ward stood as an 'Independent Conservative' - across London, four other candidates used the same party name.

In the Wormholt ward a single candidate stood for the 'British United Party' - two other candidates across London used the same banner.

Whilst Communist Party fielded 97 candidates across London at these elections - none stood in Hammersmith.

No candidates in Hammersmith listed themselves as 'Independent' at this election.

A total of 159 candidates put themselves forward for the 50 available seats - an increase from the 145 candidates who contested the 60 seats in 1974.

Election result
The Conservative Party won 24 seats and the Labour Party also won 24 seats.  With just two seats, the Liberal Party held the balance of power with no party in overall control.

The two Liberal councillors voted with the Conservatives and removed Labour, after 8 years in control of Hammersmith.

Ward results

Addison

Avonmore

Broadway

Brook Green

Colehill

College Park & Old Oak

Coningham

Crabtree

Eel Brook

Gibbs Green

Grove

Margravine

Normand

Palace

Ravenscourt

Sands End

Sherbrooke

Starch Green

Sulivan

Town

Walham

White City & Shepherds Bush

Wormholt

References

1978
1978 London Borough council elections
20th century in the London Borough of Hammersmith and Fulham